is a Prefectural Natural Park in northern Hokkaidō, Japan. Established in 1974, the park spans the municipalities of Enbetsu, Haboro, Horokanai, and Shibetsu.

Lake Shumarinai was created artificially in 1943, after which asteroid 16525 Shumarinaiko was named.

Climate

See also
 National Parks of Japan

References

External links 
  Map of Natural Parks of Hokkaidō
  Map of Shumarinai Prefectural Natural Park

Parks and gardens in Hokkaido
Protected areas established in 1974
1974 establishments in Japan